Sayyid Salih Jabr (1896–1957) was an Iraqi statesman who served as the prime minister of Iraq from March 1947 to January 1948. He was the first Shi'ite to become prime minister.

In the 1930s and 1940s, Salih attended the office of minister of justice, education, foreign affairs, interior, and finance. He was not accepted by young liberal and nationalist politicians who had been roughly handled when he was wartime minister of interior. During his time in office, the Anglo-Iraqi Treaty (1948), a revision of the Anglo-Iraqi Treaty of 1930, was prepared and signed without consultation of other Iraqi leaders. His government fell after the bloody suppression of the anti-British Al-Wathbah uprising; Salih had to repudiate the treaty and fled to England on 26 January 1948.

His son Sa'ad Salih launched the first Iraqi opposition newspaper Al Tayar from his exile in London in 1984 until the invasion in 2003.

References

External links 
 

1896 births
1957 deaths
Prime Ministers of Iraq
Finance ministers of Iraq
Foreign ministers of Iraq